The legislative districts of Davao de Oro are the representations of the province of Davao de Oro in the various national legislatures of the Philippines. The province is currently represented in the lower house of the Congress of the Philippines through its first and second congressional districts.

History

Prior to gaining separate representation, areas now under the jurisdiction of Davao de Oro were represented under the Department of Mindanao and Sulu (1917–1935), Davao Province (1935–1967), Region XI (1978–1984) and Davao del Norte (1967–1972; 1984–1998).

The passage of Republic Act No. 8470 and its subsequent ratification by plebiscite on 7 March 1998 separated from Davao del Norte's first and second districts a total of eleven municipalities to create the new province of Compostela Valley (now named Davao de Oro), which itself was apportioned into two new congressional districts. The new province's two districts first elected their own representatives in the 1998 elections.

1st District 
Municipalities: Compostela, Maragusan, Monkayo, Montevista, New Bataan
Population (2020):  346,257

2nd District 
Municipalities: Laak, Mabini, Maco, Mawab, Nabunturan, Pantukan
Population (2020):  421,290

See also 
Legislative district of Mindanao and Sulu
Legislative district of Davao
Legislative districts of Davao del Norte

References 

Davao de Oro
Politics of Davao de Oro